Sanderstead is a ward in the London Borough of Croydon. The ward received boundary changes in 2018, gaining territory from Croham ward, but losing Riddlesdown to Purley Oaks and Riddlesdown ward. The first election with new boundaries was 3 May 2018.

List of Councillors

Mayoral election results 
Below are the results for the candidate which received the highest share of the popular vote in the ward at each mayoral election.

Ward Results 

The by-election was called following the death of Cllr. Bruce T. H. Marshall.

References 

Wards of the London Borough of Croydon